Homestead Hotel, also known as the West Baden Springs Hotel, is a historic hotel building located at West Baden Springs, Orange County, Indiana.  It was built in 1913, and is a three-story, "L"-shaped, Classical Revival style brick building.  It consists of a 22-bay main block connected to a two-story rear wing by a one-story solarium with a -story cubicle pavilion.

It was listed on the National Register of Historic Places in 1998.

References 

Hotel buildings on the National Register of Historic Places in Indiana
Neoclassical architecture in Indiana
Hotel buildings completed in 1913
Buildings and structures in Orange County, Indiana
National Register of Historic Places in Orange County, Indiana